Takam Mising Porin Kebang (TMPK) is a Mishing Student union from the state of Assam, India.

History
Takam Mising Porin Kebang or TMPK is a student union from the state of Assam. It is the main students organization of the Mising tribe in the state. It mainly focuses on the socio-economic and political issues of the Mising tribals in Assam 

Takam Mising Porin Kebang(Tmpk) was established in 1971. The TMPK, earlier known as the North East Frontier Agency Students Union was constituted at Jonai HSS in 1971 and later renamed as the TMPK (Mising Students' Union) in 1982.

Demand for inclusion of MAC in the Sixth Schedule
TMPK is leading the movement of the Mising tribals demand for the inclusion of the Mising Autonomous Council (MAC) into an Autonomous District as per the sixth schedule of the Constitution of India.

References

External links
 misingonline.com website on TMPK
 macgov.in Mising Autonomous Council website
 www.misingagomkebang.org Mising Agom Kebang website

See also
Mising people
Mising Autonomous Council
Mising Baptist Kebang
Mising Agom Kebang

Organisations based in Assam
Students' unions in India
Year of establishment missing